The 1891–92 British Home Championship was an edition of the annual international football tournament played between the British Home Nations. It was won by England who won all three games against their rivals, even though they played two games on the same day against Wales and Ireland, providing a team of amateur players for the Welsh match and professionals against Ireland, both teams forging solid 2–0 victories. Scotland came second, winning their matches against Wales and Ireland, who shared third place after drawing with one another.

England's double victories came shortly after the Welsh-Irish draw in Bangor and it gave them an immediate advantage over their opponents. The Scottish team then played their games, narrowly beating Ireland in Belfast and defeating Wales by a crushing 6–1 scoreline to equal England's points tally and become favourites. In the final match at Glasgow, England and Scotland played out a decider which England won easily, scoring four early goals to which Scotland could only reply with a single goal of their own.

Table

Results

Winning squad

References

British
Home
Home
Home
British Home Championships
Brit
Brit
1891–92 in Irish association football